"Via Negativa" is the seventh episode of the eighth season and the 168th episode of the science fiction television series The X-Files. The episode first aired in the United States and Canada on December 17, 2000, on Fox and subsequently aired in the United Kingdom. It was written by executive producer Frank Spotnitz and directed by Tony Wharmby. It is a Monster-of-the-Week episode, unconnected to the series' wider mythology. The episode earned a Nielsen household rating of 7.3 and was viewed by 12.37 million viewers. It was generally well received by television critics, with many positively commenting on the "eerie" atmosphere of the dream sequences; one critic referred to it as a "superb X-Files episode."

The series centers on FBI special agents Dana Scully (Gillian Anderson) and her new partner John Doggett (Robert Patrick)—following the alien abduction of her former partner, Fox Mulder (David Duchovny)—who work on cases linked to the paranormal, called X-Files. In this episode, Scully takes time off to deal with the early stages of her pregnancy, and Doggett and Walter Skinner attempt to avert the mysterious murder spree of a religious cult leader who kills his victims in their sleep. Eventually, the cult leader's essence of evil possesses Doggett, who is urged to murder Scully while he sleeps.

Spotnitz was inspired to write the episode after being intrigued by the mental image of a tube of toothpaste that, when opened, oozed blood. Because Gillian Anderson was not available for most of filming, the recurring characters of Walter Skinner and The Lone Gunmen were brought in. The episode's title, "Via Negativa"—which means "Negative Way" in Latin—is a theology that attempts to describe God by characterizing what God is not.

Plot 
In Pittsburgh, two FBI agents, Angus Stedman (Lawrence LeJohn) and James Leeds (Kevin McClatchy), are observing a house when Leeds falls asleep. When he awakes, he discovers that the front door of the house is open. The two agents investigate and stumble upon a room filled with dead bodies. Suddenly, a man wielding an axe and possessing a third eye murders both agents with a blow to the head.

The following day, Dana Scully (Gillian Anderson) calls John Doggett (Robert Patrick) to inform him about the case and says she will not be joining him, due to personal matters. Doggett visits the crime scene, where he meets up with his boss, Walter Skinner (Mitch Pileggi). Skinner tells him about the cult and how the victims died. Leeds' body is found in his car, but his partner, Stedman, is missing, along with cult leader Anthony Tipet (Keith Szarabajka): the man with the third eye. The FBI later finds Stedman at his locked-up condo with a fatal blow to the head. Meanwhile, Tipet is searching for a pharmacist and stumbles into a phone booth to call an unnamed person. When a tramp asks him for change, Tipet attacks the tramp, trapping him in the pavement and axing his forehead.

At the FBI, Skinner briefs Alvin Kersh (James Pickens, Jr.),  and other agents about the case. He tells them that Tipet used the hallucinogenic plant Tabernanthe iboga as an aid to bringing himself closer to God using a combination of Christian and Eastern religious practices called the via negativa, (Latin for 'negative way' - a term used traditionally to describe a certain system of religious thought and practice). Tracing Tipet's earlier call leads Doggett and Skinner to Andre Bormanis (Grant Heslov), a drug dealer. Bormanis is arrested, and put in a cell at the local police department. At the jail, Doggett has a vision of him holding Scully's severed head in his hands. After waking, Doggett realizes his vision was a bad dream. Meanwhile, in his cell, Bormanis has fallen asleep, and is dreaming of being attacked by rats. Doggett and the other officers find Bormanis' gnawed-up body.

Doggett returns to the X-Files office, where, to his surprise, he meets The Lone Gunmen. They tell him about the history of the third eye. While coming to the same conclusion, they are convinced that Tipet is projecting himself into people's dreams and killing them there. Returning to the warehouse where they found Bormanis, Skinner and Doggett meet Tipet, who is trying to take his own life by pushing his head through a table saw. They rush him to the hospital, where Doggett by surprise finds Scully's name on the register. With Tipet in a coma, Kersh decides to pull the plug on the case, saying they've found the main suspect. But Doggett and Skinner are not satisfied, saying there are no explanations for the various murders and events surrounding the case.

The next day, Doggett wakes up and discovers that he now has a third eye in the middle of his forehead. Suddenly, it vanishes. At the FBI building, he talks to Skinner, hoping for reassurance. He expresses his fear that, despite Tipet being in a coma, Tipet may still be able to enter into his dreams. Skinner, however, dismisses his concerns and sends him home. While leaving, Doggett has a hallucination of Tipet, ordering him to kill Scully. Suddenly, Doggett finds himself in front of Scully. Rather than kill his partner, he turns the axe upon himself. Doggett is immediately awakened from his dark reverie and finds himself in his bedroom, with Scully standing over his bed. He begins to thank her for saving his life, but she informs him that Tipet died due to his coma.

Production 
Frank Spotnitz was inspired to write "Via Negativa" after a rafting trip in which a "friend of a friend" mentioned a disturbing visual: a tube of toothpaste that, when opened, oozed human blood. The idea inspired Spotnitz to work it into an episode, but due to its strangeness, he was unable to think of any real-world scenarios in which this would happens. Consequently, he began to look into "dreams and nightmares." He eventually came up with the idea of a cult trying to reach a higher plane of existence, but instead stumbling into a "lower place, a darker plane." Spotnitz later explained: "What if the higher plane is a darker plane, what if we think we're reaching up but we're reaching down." The episode's title, "Via Negativa," means "Negative Way" in Latin. This type of theology, more commonly referred to as apophatic theology, attempts to describe God by expanding upon what God is not.

Gillian Anderson's character Dana Scully would not be available, since the writing staff had decided before the episode was written that she would spend most of her time in the hospital. Spotnitz saw this as an opportunity to further evolve Doggett's character. In order to fill Anderson's void, two recurring groups of characters were brought in: Walter Skinner and The Lone Gunmen. Spotnitz noted that, "we were eager to get Skinner out from behind the desk, and we were always looking for opportunities to get him out of that office and get him into the field." Mitch Pileggi, who portrayed Walter Skinner, was pleased with the final product. He later complimented the work of Robert Patrick, who played Doggett, saying, "It was a big hole when Mulder was gone, but I thought that Robert came in and did a wonderful job. He brought a really good energy to the set, and it was a lot of fun getting to know and work with him." Spotnitz was eager to use The Lone Gunmen in the episode, since this the episode would mark their first scene together with Doggett. Robert Patrick called the episode his "favorite episode," because the writers created a "vulnerable" moment for his character.

The character of Andre Bormanis was named after one of Spotnitz's childhood friends, who went on to become one of the science consultants for both Star Trek: Voyager and Star Trek: Deep Space Nine. In preparing the character's death scene, Tony Wharmby, the episode's director, spent a whole day shooting inserts of rats. In total, the film crew used 500 rats. Initially, Wharmby had an issue getting a shot where the rats congregate in the middle of a room. In order to fix this, animal trainers continuously released more rats until the middle part of the room was finally covered. The crew later spent many hours "painting out rat droppings in that shot."

Reception

Ratings
"Via Negativa" premiered on December 17, 2000, on American television on Fox. The episode earned a Nielsen household rating of 7.3, meaning that it was seen by 7.3% of the nation's estimated households. The episode was watched by 7.36 million households and 12.37 million viewers. Fox promoted the episode with the tagline "They say if you die in a dream ... you will never wake up."

Reviews
"Via Negativa" received mostly positive reviews from critics. Michael Roffman of Time named it the "best post-Mulder" episode, stating that "episodes like this proved there were just enough thrills to get by without Spooky". Zack Handlen of The A.V. Club awarded the episode an "A−" and noted that the episode had an "undeniable power that took me almost entirely off-guard". Although cautioning that "Via Negativa" is not "some kind of lost classic" and that the story itself was not "all that impressive", he praised the atmosphere of the episode, describing it as "heavy, doom-laden, and frequently bizarre". In fact, he argued that it largely "makes up for any shortcomings in the script". Robert Shearman and Lars Pearson, in their book Wanting to Believe: A Critical Guide to The X-Files, Millennium & The Lone Gunmen, rated the episode five stars out of five and called it "one of the best standalone X-Files in years."

George Avaros and Michael Liedtke from the Contra Costa Times were overall positive towards the episode, saying it had all the features which created a "superb X-Files episode". They further stated that it had an "eerie, almost surreal quality sprinkled with pithy dialogue, comic relief and cryptic insights into key characters that left us wondering what sort of trouble might be around the bend". Avaros and Liedtke also reacted positively to the numerous references to Fox Mulder. Finally, they compared the episode to the work of David Lynch in his series, Twin Peaks. Paula Vitaris from Cinefantastique gave the episode a moderately positive review and awarded it two-and-a-half stars out of four.

Notes

References
Footnotes

Bibliography

External links 

 

2000 American television episodes
Television episodes set in Pittsburgh
Television episodes about nightmares
The X-Files (season 8) episodes
Television episodes set in Virginia